Bromley College may refer to:
 Bromley College of Further & Higher Education, part of London South East Colleges
 Bromley & Sheppard’s Colleges
 Bromley College of Art

Education in Kent